Stadio Carlo Speroni is a multi-use stadium in Busto Arsizio, Italy.  It is currently used mostly for football matches and is the home ground of Pro Patria. The stadium holds 5,000 and is named after Italian long-distance runner Carlo Speroni (1895–1969).

References

Carlo Speroni
Busto Arsizio
Carlo
Aurora Pro Patria 1919